David Samwell (15 October 1751 – 23 November 1798) was a Welsh naval surgeon and poet. He was an important supporter of Welsh cultural organisations and was known by the pseudonym Dafydd Ddu Feddyg.

Personal history
Samwell was born in Nantglyn, a small village in Denbighshire to William Samuel, a local vicar. His grandfather, Edward Samuel was also a notable Welsh author and poet. Samwell became a surgeon in the Royal Navy and between 1776 and 1779 he sailed around the world with Captain James Cook on board . As a ship's surgeon it was Samwell's job to ensure the crew's health did not deteriorate over the long journeys to the Pacific Ocean. Aboard the ship Samwell wrote of his travels, including some poetry.

The journal of his experiences aboard Captain James Cook's ship provide a detailed account of the third and last voyages of Cook to the Pacific Ocean. Part of the journal  describes the death of Captain Cook at the hands of natives on the Sandwich Islands in 1779. He also wrote an unpublished journal, Some Account of a Voyage to the South Seas 1776-1777-1778 which is a work of social anthropology.

Between his voyages, Samwell lived in London. There he and other Welshmen would meet, and he joined the Gwyneddigion Society which had formed in 1770. The society was initially formed for men from North Wales, but gradually the membership grew to accept all Welshmen. The society celebrated with a rowdy ball every St David's Day and Samwell was described as one of the noisiest. He was described as 'tall, stout, blackhaired, pock-marked, fierce looking, wondrous friendly in company' and when teased he would close one eye and look for a pot to throw at his tormenter.

In 1792 Iolo Morganwg (Edward Williams) organised here the first meeting of Gorsedd Beirdd Ynys Prydain at Primrose Hill in London. Samwell was present at the event which saw a stone circle set and a sword was ceremonially sheathed as a symbol of peace after the events of the French Revolution. The next year though saw Britain enter conflict with France during the French Revolutionary Wars, and in 1798 Samwell was treating English prisoners of war in Versailles. He returned to Britain in the autumn of that year and died in London in November.

References

Bibliography

External links

 
 

1751 births
1798 deaths
18th-century Welsh writers
18th-century British male writers
People from Denbighshire
Welsh surgeons
18th-century Welsh medical doctors
18th-century Welsh poets
Royal Navy Medical Service officers
James Cook